Diban (also spelled Thiban or Zeiban) is a town in eastern Syria, administratively part of the Deir ez-Zor Governorate, located along the eastern bank of the Euphrates River, south of Deir ez-Zor, 17 kilometers south of al-Busayrah and 13 kilometers north of Al-Asharah. Nearby localities include Al Mayadin to the north and west, al-Hawayij to the northeast, Mahkan to the south west and al-Tayanah to the southeast. According to the Syria Central Bureau of Statistics, Diban had a population of 9,000 in the 2004 census. It is the administrative seat of a nahiyah ("subdistrict") which consists of ten localities with a total population of 65,079 in 2004.

Part of Diban is situated on a hill called Tell Diban, which is also an archaeological site. Tell Diban is identified with the ancient Aramean city of Rummunina, a probable derivation of the Aramaic word rumman ("pomegranate"). The area and its surrounding fields served as a pre-war camp for Assyrian king Tukulti-Ninurta II's army during his last military campaign in 885 BCE. The king reported that Rummunina was situated along a canal of the Khabur River, a tributary of the Euphrates. According to Belgian orientalist Edward Lipinsky, Tell Diban was "certainly occupied during the Iron Age."

During the Syrian Revolution, Diban was captured from the Syrian government by the Free Syrian Army but then occupied by ISIL until the Syrian Democratic Forces captured the town on 18 November 2017 with massive support of the US-led coalition.

References

Bibliography

Populated places in Mayadin District
Populated places on the Euphrates River
Towns in Syria